KGBL (100.9 FM) is a radio station licensed to serve the community of Lakin, Kansas. The station is owned by Steckline Communications, Inc., and airs a country music format.

The station was assigned the call sign KGRQ by the Federal Communications Commission on September 23, 2009. The station changed its call sign to KGBL on March 1, 2014.

References

External links
 Official Website
 

GBL
Radio stations established in 2012
2012 establishments in Kansas
Country radio stations in the United States
Kearny County, Kansas